The 1928 Oldenburg state election was held on 20 May 1928  to elect the 48 members of the Landtag of the Free State of Oldenburg.

Results

References 

Oldenburg
Elections in Lower Saxony